Hasargundgi is a village and Grampanchayat headquarter  of Hasargundgi grampanchayat, in the southern state of Karnataka, India It is located in Chincholi taluk of Kalburgi district. The nearest village is Chimmanchod.

Demographics
As of 2011 India census Hasargundgi had a population of 2364 with 1177 males and 1187 females.

Education
The schools in Hasargundgi are Government higher primary and high school 
run by Government of Karnataka India

Agriculture
Major Crops produced in the Hasargundgi pare Pigeon pea, Sorghum, Pearl millet, chickpea, mung bean, vigna mungo.

Transport
KSRTC bus facility is available to travel within the Karnataka state and Nabour states, to travel within 15 to 20 km, share auto available. The nearest railway station is (43 km) tandur railway station (TDU, railway station code). The nearest airport is (155 km) Rajiv Gandhi International Airport.

See also
 Gulbarga
 Districts of Karnataka

References

External links
 http://Gulbarga.nic.in

Villages in Kalaburagi district